James Orville Browning (March 31, 1903 – June 19, 1936) was an American professional wrestler.

Professional wrestling career 
Browning was raised on a farm in Missouri. After working in construction and on oil fields, Browning made his debut in professional wrestling in 1923. he went on to work in many territories in the United States and Canada, feuding with wrestlers such as Jim Londos, Joe Stecher, and Ed "Strangler" Lewis. He was managed by Frank Smith. 

On February 20, 1933, Browning defeated Ed "Strangler" Lewis for the New York State Athletic Commission World Heavyweight Championship in Madison Square Gardens with an airplane scissors hold. He held the championship for 490 days, during which time he drew large crowds. On June 25, 1934, Browning dropped the title to Jim Londos.

Browning retired from wrestling in February 1936 due to ill health (trachoma, an ulcerated stomach, and liver problems).

Death 
Browning died on June 25, 1936 at the age of 33 from a pulmonary embolism resulting from abdominal surgery.

Championships and accomplishments  
 California State Athletic Commission
 World Heavyweight Championship (Los Angeles version) (1 time)
New York State Athletic Commission
New York State Athletic Commission World Heavyweight Championship (1 time)

See also
 List of premature professional wrestling deaths

References

External links 
 

1903 births
1936 deaths
American male professional wrestlers
People from Lawrence County, Missouri
Professional wrestlers from Missouri
20th-century American people
20th-century professional wrestlers
Deaths from pulmonary embolism